LN is a slowcore band from Ohio that has released several albums and EPs on California-based independent record label Velvet Blue Music. LN is primarily the work of artist Gary Murray. In December 2004, American webzine Somewhere Cold ranked the album Dirt Floor Hotel Part 1 No. 6 on their 2004 Somewhere Cold Awards Hall of Fame list.

Name
LN was originally short for Love Neptune. The name was shortened because Velvet Blue Music was already associated with the bands Starflyer 59 and Jupiter James, and it was felt that the addition of Love Neptune to the roster would make it too spacey.

Beginning in 2006, Gary Murray began releasing music under his own name.

Discography

Albums
 Novel (2001, Velvet Blue Music)
 Dirt Floor Hotel Part 1 (2005, Velvet Blue Music)
 Dirt Floor Hotel Part 2 (2005, Velvet Blue Music)
 Minor Lives (2013, GMLN)

EPs
 Cool September Skies (1996, Velvet Blue Music)
 Plum Brook (1999, Velvet Blue Music)
 Imaginary Cars (2000, Velvet Blue Music)
 Gravity Gun (2005, Velvet Blue Music)
 Drawn by Swans (2005, Velvet Blue Music)
 The Revenant Waltz (2006, Velvet Blue Music) (as Gary Murray)
 Downstream Angels (2008, Velvet Blue Music) (as Gary Murray & LN)

7"
 Without Your Song (2005, Velvet Blue Music)
 Friends Who Play Guitar (2006, Clerestory AV) (split 7-inch with Gary Murray and MAP)

Collections
 So You May Find Me When I'm Lost (2009, Velvet Blue Music)

References

Somewherecold - Gary Murray interview

Alternative rock groups from Ohio